Pitfalls of a Big City is a 1919 American silent drama film directed by Frank Lloyd and starring Gladys Brockwell, William Scott and William Sheer.

Cast
 Gladys Brockwell as Molly Moore 
 William Scott as Jerry Sullivan 
 William Sheer as Spike Davis 
 Neva Gerber as Marion Moore 
 Al Fremont as Dave Garrity 
 Ashton Dearholt as Ted Pemberton 
 Janice Wilson as Alice Pemberton

References

Bibliography
 Solomon, Aubrey. The Fox Film Corporation, 1915-1935: A History and Filmography. McFarland, 2011.

External links

1919 films
1919 drama films
Silent American drama films
Films directed by Frank Lloyd
American silent feature films
1910s English-language films
Fox Film films
American black-and-white films
1910s American films